Shintaro Higashi (born December 16, 1984) is a Japanese-American judo competitor and 6th degree black belt in judo for the United States in the 100 kg category.  He is the head instructor at the Kokushi Budo Institute, a member of the New York Athletic Club, and a professor at Brooklyn College.

Personal life
He attended Hunter College, where he earned a bachelor's degree in psychology and a master's degree in education.   He also attended NYU Stern where he earned a MBA.
While at Hunter, he was a member of the wrestling team, on which he received All-State status.  He is the son of Nobuyoshi Higashi, the founder of Kokushi-ryu jujutsu and a Judo, Aikido, and Karate instructor.

Martial arts
He holds black belts in judo, jujitsu, aikido, and karate.

He has won Gold in the 2007, 2011 USA Judo Senior National Championships and placed 5th in the US Open. He also took Gold in the International Tournament Am-Cam Judo Challenge and placed third in the National Championships.
He would be a member of Team USA in 2007, 2010 World Judo Championships – Men's 100 kg and 2011 World Judo Championships – Men's 100 kg for the world games. He trained for the 2008 and the 2012 US Olympic Team at 100 kg.  He achieved 43rd in the world ranking for Judo behind Kyle Vashkulat in the United States. He has also trained in freestyle wrestling, boxing and has a black belt in Brazilian jiu-jitsu.

References

External links
 http://www.shintarohigashi.com/

Living people
American male karateka
Judoka trainers
American male judoka
American sportspeople of Japanese descent
1984 births
Brooklyn College faculty